American Cowslip is a 2009 independent American comedy feature film directed by Mark David. It revolves around heroin addict, Ethan Inglebrink, whose life is centered on his garden and his group of eccentric friends. American Cowslip is David's third film, following his debut, Sweet Thing (1999), and his second, acclaimed feature, Intoxicating (2003). This was Peter Falk's final film appearance two years before his death June 23, 2011.

Plot
Ethan Inglebrink (Ronnie Gene Blevens) is an agoraphobic heroin addict who lives in a homogeneous California town where nothing ever happens. A misfit, clad in a powder blue tux, he has convinced his poker buddies, and surrogate moms, Roe (Diane Ladd), Sandy (Cloris Leachman), and Lou Anne (Lin Shaye), that he is diabetic and his needles are for insulin, not heroin. His next-door neighbor is his landlord and former high school football coach Trevor O'Hart (Rip Torn), who wants nothing more than to kick Ethan out on the street. Complicating matters even further is that Ethan's older brother Todd (Val Kilmer), the local sheriff, is convinced that his brother can only be saved by an act of God, and recruits the family priest (Peter Falk) to get the job done. Meanwhile, as the Garden of the Year competition draws near, Ethan becomes convinced that he can take the $10,000 top prize and pay off his delinquent rent if he can just grow the perfect American Cowslip. Little does Ethan realize that salvation may lie not in the money he could win for growing a rare flower, but with the companionship and understanding offered by his 17-year-old neighbor Georgia (Hanna R. Hall), who longs to escape her abusive father (Bruce Dern).

Cast
 Ronnie Gene Blevins as Ethan Inglebrink
 Val Kilmer as Todd Inglebrink
 Diane Ladd as Roe
 Rip Torn as Trevor O'Hart
 Cloris Leachman as Sandy
 Lin Shaye as Lou Anne
 Josh Perry as Billy
 Peter Falk as Father Randolph
 Bruce Dern as Cliff
 Tom Huddlestone as Rabbi Dave
 Priscilla Barnes as Samantha
 Hanna R. Hall as Georgia
 Blake Clark as Grimes
 Trevor Lissauer as Jim Bob
 Erik Fellows as Rourke

References

External links
 
 
 

2009 films
2009 comedy films
American comedy films
2009 independent films
Films set in California
Films about drugs
2000s English-language films
American independent films
2000s American films